Moore's Ford Bridge was a historic structure located northeast of Monticello, Iowa, United States. The Jones County Board of Supervisors received a petition for a bridge at this location in September 1877. While they agreed there was a need, they put off erecting a bridge here until other bridges in the county were completed at major crossings. They finally authorized this bridge in September 1883 and contracted with the Morse Bridge Company of Youngstown, Ohio to erect a single Pratt through truss span here. It was completed in June 1884 for $2,305. The bridge was listed on the National Register of Historic Places in 1998. It has subsequently been taken down.

See also
 
 
 
 
 List of bridges on the National Register of Historic Places in Iowa
 National Register of Historic Places listings in Jones County, Iowa

References

Bridges completed in 1884
Bridges in Jones County, Iowa
National Register of Historic Places in Jones County, Iowa
Road bridges on the National Register of Historic Places in Iowa
Truss bridges in Iowa
Pratt truss bridges in the United States